Stalagmites is a genus of ascomycete fungi in the family Nectriaceae. It is a monotypic genus containing the sole species Stalagmites tumefaciens.

External links
 

Nectriaceae genera
Monotypic Sordariomycetes genera
Taxa named by Hans Sydow
Taxa described in 1914